Peter Alan Baker (born 7 October 1967) is an English professional golfer. He had three wins on the European Tour, one in 1988 and two in 1993. He represented Europe in the 1993 Ryder Cup.

Amateur career
Baker learned golf at his father's nine-hole Himley Hall course and was taught by Sandy Lyle's father Alex. In 1985, he was the joint winner of the Brabazon Trophy, after a tie with Roger Roper. He represented Great Britain & Ireland in the 1985 Walker Cup and turned professional the following year.

Professional career
Baker was a consistent performer on the European Tour from the late 1980s until the early years of the new Millennium, with three tournament wins on the tour and a highest Order of Merit finish of seventh in 1993. His one Ryder Cup appearance for Europe came in the losing 1993 team. He won three of his four matches, winning two fourball matches, playing with Ian Woosnam, and beating Corey Pavin in the singles.

In 2007 Baker won two events on the second-tier Challenge Tour, the Credit Suisse Challenge and the Open AGF-Allianz Côtes d’Armor Bretagne on his 40th birthday. He also won the Mauritius Open at the end of 2007, beating José-Filipe Lima by three shots. In 2009 he had his third Challenge Tour success, winning the Credit Suisse Challenge for the second time.

Since reaching 50, he has played on the European Senior Tour. He won the 2019 Arras Open Senior Hauts de France, 5 strokes ahead of James Kingston.

Baker was one of Ian Woosnam's vice-captains at the 2006 Ryder Cup.

Amateur wins
1983 Peter McEvoy Trophy, Carris Trophy
1985 Carris Trophy, Brabazon Trophy (tie with Roger Roper)

Professional wins (11)

European Tour wins (3)

European Tour playoff record (2–0)

Challenge Tour wins (3)

Challenge Tour playoff record (1–0)

Other wins (4)
 1990 UAP European Under-25 Championship
 1994 Tournoi Perrier de Paris (with David J. Russell)
 1998 Farmfoods British Par 3 Championship
 2007 Mauritius Open

European Senior Tour wins (1)

Results in major championships

CUT = missed the half-way cut
"T" = tied

Team appearances
Amateur
Jacques Léglise Trophy (representing Great Britain & Ireland): 1983 (winners), 1984 (winners), 1985 (winners)
European Boys' Team Championship (representing England: 1984, 1985 (winners)
European Amateur Team Championship (representing England): 1985
Walker Cup (representing Great Britain & Ireland): 1985
St Andrews Trophy (representing Great Britain & Ireland): 1986 (winners)

Professional
Ryder Cup (representing Europe): 1993
Alfred Dunhill Cup (representing England): 1993, 1998
World Cup (representing England): 1999

See also
2007 Challenge Tour graduates
2009 Challenge Tour graduates

References

External links

BBC interview

English male golfers
European Tour golfers
Ryder Cup competitors for Europe
People from Shifnal
1967 births
Living people